Ghamubar Zom is a mountain in the Hindu Raj mountain range of Asia. Located in Gilgit–Baltistan, Pakistan, it has a summit elevation of 6,518 m above sea level.
The mountain is close to the border of Gilgit–Baltistan and Khyber Pakhtunkhwa. The nearest village from the mountain is Darkot in  Yasin valley.

The entire prominence of mountain is visible from Darkot and Rawat villages.

See also
 Hindu Raj
 List of mountains in Pakistan
 List of Ultras of the Western Himalayas

References

Mountains of Gilgit-Baltistan
Six-thousanders of the Hindu Raj